Kushabhau Thakre Marg commonly known as Super Corridor (MR10) is a road that connects AH47 Agra - Mumbai National Highway with MP SH 27 and Indore Airport. Kushabhau Thakre Marg is one of the busiest roads of the city of Indore and has become a new hub in the city.

Connectivity

Metro
The work for the Phase-1 of the Indore Metro is currently in full swing slated to be operational by late 2023. A depot is also being developed near Gandhi Nagar Square.

References

Roads in Madhya Pradesh
Transport in Indore
Roads in Indore